Phonic may refer to:

 A synonym of phonetic, pertaining to sounds or speech
 Phonic Corporation, a Taiwan-based audio equipment manufacturer
 Phonic FM, a community radio station in Exeter, Devon, England

See also
Phonics, a method for teaching reading